This is a timeline of major events in the Muslim world from 1400 AD to 1499 AD (803 AH – 905 AH).

1400–1409

Golden Horde
 ca. 1400: Temur Qutlugh dies and is succeeded by Shadi Beg.
 1407: Shadi Beg is deposed and Edigu installs Pulad Khan as his successor.

Mamluk Empire
1400: The Burji Mamluks lose Syria to Tamerlane.

Ottoman Empire
 1402–1403: Beyazid I is defeated at the Battle of Ankara and  taken captive by Tamerlane. An interregnum period begins when the sons of Beyazid I compete for the Ottoman throne.

Timurid Empire
 1405: Tamerlane dies and is succeeded by his son, Shah Rukh.

1410–1419

Golden Horde

 1410: Pulad Khan is deposed in favor of Timur.
 1412: Timur is deposed in favor of Jalal ad-Din khan, the first of Tokhtamysh's sons to take power since his death.
 1413: Jalal ad-Din khan is deposed in favor of his brother, Karim Berdi.
 1414: Karim Berdi is deposed in favor of Kebek.
 1416: Kebek Khan is deposed in favor of Yeremferden, the brother of Karim Berdi and Jalal ad-Din khan.
 1419: Yeremferden is assassinated; control of the Horde is split between Dawlat Berdi and Olugh Mokhammad.

Ottoman Empire

 1413: Interregnum period ends and Mehmed I becomes Sultan.

Nogai Horde

 1419: Edigu is assassinated by Olugh Mokhammad, who assumes his place as Khan, re-uniting it with the Golden Horde.

1420–1429

Golden Horde

 1420: Dawlat Berdi captures Sarai and expands his sphere of influence beyond the Crimean Peninsula.
 1423: Baraq defeats Dawlat Berdi and Olugh Mokhammad and takes control of the Horde. Olugh Mokhammad flees to Lithuania.
 1427: With the assistance of Vytautas the Great, Olugh Mokhammad and Dawlat Berdi defeat and kill Baraq.

Kara Koyunlu

 1420: Qara Yusuf dies and is succeeded by his son, Qara Iskander.

Morocco

 1420: Abu Said Othman is assassinated and succeeded by Abdul Haq, his infant son.

Tunisia

1424: The Hafsids come to power.
1429: The Hafsids attack the island of Malta and take 3000 slaves although they do not conquer the island. Piracy against Christian shipping particularly grows during the rule of Abd al-Aziz II (1394–1434).

Uzbeks

 1425: Abul Khayr takes control of the Little jüz.

1430–1440

Ak Koyunlu
 1434: Qara Osman dies and is succeeded by Ali Beg.
 1438: Ali Beg is overthrown by his brother, Hamza.

Golden Horde

 1432: Dawlat Berdi is assassinated and Hacı I Giray conquers the Crimea, founding the Crimean Khanate.
 1437: Olugh Mokhammad is defeated by Sayid Ahmad I, who takes control of the Horde.

Kara Koyunlu
 1434: Qara Iskandar is deposed in favor of his brother, Jahan Shah.

Khanate of Kazan

1438: Olugh Mokhammad founds the Khanate of Kazan.

Mamluk Empire

 1438: Barsbay dies and his son, Jamaluddin Yusuf, is prevented from taking power in a coup orchestrated by Saifuddin Gakmuk.

Tunisia

 1434: Abdul Faris dies after forty years of rule and is succeeded by Abu Abdullah Muhammad.
 1435: Abu Abdullah Muhammad is deposed in favor of Abu Umar Othman.

Uzbeks
 1430: Abul Khayr occupies Khwarezmia.

1440–1449

Ak Koyunlu

 1440: Hamza is overthrown by Jahangir, a son of Ali Beg.

Ottoman Empire
 1444: The Anti-Ottoman League of Lezhe in Albania is formed by Scanderbeg. Murad II voluntarily abdicates from his throne in favor of his son Mehmed II after the former's defeat at the hands of crusaders at the Battle of Varna. 
 1446: Murad II reclaims the throne.
 1448: The Ottomans are victorious at the Second Battle of Kosovo. Serbia is annexed and Bosnia is made a vassal.

Timurid Empire

 1446: Shah Rukh dies and is succeeded by Ulugh Beg. 
 1449: Ulugh Beg dies and is succeeded by 'Abd al-Latif.

Uzbeks

 1449: Abul Khayr captures Farghana.

1450–1459

Ak Koyunlu

 1453: Jahangir dies and is succeeded by his son, Uzun Hassan.

Great Horde

 1459: Küchük Muhammad dies and is succeeded by his son, Maxmud.

Mamluk Empire

 1453: Gakmuk dies and is succeeded by his son, Fakhruddin Othman, who is then overthrown by Saifuddin Inal.

Ottoman Empire

 1451: Murad II dies and is succeeded by his son, Mehmed II.
 1453: Constantinople is captured.
 1456: Wallachia is made a vassal.

Timurid Empire

 1450: 'Abd al-Latif is assassinated and succeeded by Abu Sa'id.

1460–1469

Ottoman Empire
 1462: Albania is annexed.

Mamluk Empire

 1461: Saifuddin Inal died and is succeeded by his son, Shahabuddin Ahmad, who is then overthrown by Saifuddin Khushqadam.

Great Horde

 1465: Maxmud founds the Astrakhan Khanate after he is deposed by his brother, Akhmat Khan.

Kara Koyunlu

 1467: Jahan Shah is killed in a surprise attack arranged by his rival, Uzun Hasan, leader of Ak Koyunlu. Ak Koyunlu then annexes Kara Koyunlu.

Morocco

 1465: Abdul Haq is assassinated, ending the Marinid dynasty. Sharif Muhammad al Jati assumes power.

Mamluk Empire

 1465: Khushqadam dies and is succeeded by his son, Saifuddin Yel Bey, who is then deposed by Temur Bugha.
 1468: Temur Bugha is deposed by Qaitbay.

Kazakh Khanate

 1465: Kazakh nobles Abu Sa'id Janibek Khan and Kerei Khan rebel against Uzbek ruler Abu'l-Khayr Khan and form their own independent state, the Kazakh Khanate.

Uzbeks

 1468: Abu'l-Khayr Khan dies and is succeeded by his son Haidar Sultan.

Ak Koyunlu

 1467: Kara Koyunlu is annexed.
 1468: The Timurids are defeated at the Battle of Qarabagh. Ak Koyunlu then becomes the masters of Persia and Khorasan.

Timurid Empire
 1469: Abu Sa'id dies; the Timurid state. In Husayn Bayqarah maintains control of Greater Khorasan.

1470–1479

Morocco
 1472: Sharif Muhammad al Jati is overthrown by Muhammad al Shaikh, establishing the Wattasid dynasty.

Kazakh Khanate

 1473: Kerei Khan, the first ruler of the Kazakh Khanate, dies and Abu Sa'id Janibek Khan succeeds him as the empire's second ruler.

Ottoman Empire

 1473: Mehmed II defeats sultan Uzun Hasan of Ak Koyunlu at the Battle of Otluk Beli.
 1475: The Khanate of Crimea is conquered and made a vassal state. Venice is defeated and the Ottoman Empire becomes master of the Aegean Sea.

Ak Koyunlu

 1478: Uzun Hasan dies and is succeeded by his son, Khalil ibn Uzun Hasan.
 1479: Khalil Hasan is overthrown by his uncle, Y‘aqub ibn Uzun Hasan.

1480–1489

Great Horde

 1480: Akhmat Khan is assassinated and succeeded by his son, Said Ahmad II.
 1481: Said Ahmad II is overthrown by his brother Murtada.

Kazakh Khanate

1480: Abu Sa'id Janibek Khan dies and is succeeded by his nephew Burunduk, who is the son of Kerei Khan.

Ottoman Empire

 1481: Mehmed II dies and is succeeded by Beyazid II. Cen Sultan rebels.

Uzbeks
 1488: Haider Sultan dies and is succeeded by his nephew, Shaybani Khan.

Tunisia
 1488: Abu Umar Othman dies and is succeeded by Abu Zikriya Yahya.
 1489: Abu Zikriya Yahya is overthrown by Abul Mumin.

1490–1500

Tunisia
 1490: Abul Mumin is overthrown and Abu Zikriya Yahya retakes the throne.

Iberia
 1492: Granada is captured by Spain, ending 800 years of Muslim rule in Spain.

Ak Koyunlu
 1493: Y‘aqub ibn Uzun Hasan dies and is succeeded by his son, Baisonqur ibn Y‘aqub.
 1495: Baisonqur is overthrown by his cousin, Rustam ibn Maqsud.
 1497: Maqsud is overthrown by his cousin, Ahmad Gövde ibn Muhammad.

Mamluk Empire
 1496: Qaitbay abdicates and is succeeded by his son, Nasir Muhammad.
 1498:  Nasir Muhammad is deposed and replaced by Zahir Kanauh.

Uzbeks
 1499: Shaybani Khan conquers Transoxiana.

Great Horde

 1499: Murtada dies and is succeeded by Said Ahmad III.

Ottoman Empire

 1499: the Ottoman fleet defeats the Venetians in the Battle of Zonchio.

See also
Timeline of Muslim history

References
Bosworth, Clifford Edmund, The New Islamic Dynasties: A Chronological and Genealogical Manual, p. 253. Edinburgh University Press, 2004.

15